is a railway station in the city of Numazu, Shizuoka Prefecture, Japan, operated by Central Japan Railway Company (JR Tōkai).

Lines
Katahama Station is served by the Tōkaidō Main Line, and is located 130.3 kilometers from the starting point of the line at Tokyo Station.

Station layout
The station has two opposing side platforms serving two tracks, with the station building built over the platforms. The station building has automated ticket machines, TOICA automated turnstiles, and a staffed ticket office.

Platforms

Adjacent stations

History
Katahama Station opened on March 21, 1987, the last train station to be built by the Japanese National Railways (JNR) before its privatization. With the privatization of JNR on 1 April 1987, the station came under the control of JR Central.

Station numbering was introduced to the section of the Tōkaidō Line operated JR Central in March 2018; Katahama Station was assigned station number CA04.

Passenger statistics
In fiscal 2017, the station was used by an average of 2452 passengers daily (boarding passengers only).

Surrounding area
The station is located in a suburban residential area to the east of the center of Numazu.

See also
 List of Railway Stations in Japan

References
Yoshikawa, Fumio. Tokaido-sen 130-nen no ayumi. Grand-Prix Publishing (2002) .

External links

  

Stations of Central Japan Railway Company
Railway stations in Shizuoka Prefecture
Railway stations in Japan opened in 1987
Tōkaidō Main Line
Numazu, Shizuoka